Admittance may refer to:
 Admittance, a measure of how easily a circuit allows an electric current to flow
 Admittance (geophysics), the small effects of atmospheric pressure on gravity
 Thermal admittance, a measure of the ability of a material to transfer heat (see thermal conductivity)

See also 
Admission (disambiguation)